The Council for International Development ( in Māori) is a charity that works to achieve effective high quality international development programmes that focus on the alleviation and eradication of poverty. It works to enhance the capacity and participation of member agencies, the New Zealand government and other sectors of the New Zealand community.

The Council for International Development was formed in 1985 by a small group of aid and development agencies which identified the need to coordinate some activities and present a single voice on issues of common concern. Today it has over 80 members that include most of New Zealand's major Non Governmental Organisations that work in aid and development. It:
provides a forum for discussion of cooperative action on international aid and development issues
strengthens national and international links between organisations and individuals involved in international development
liaises with the NZ Government, the International Development Group and the Ministry of Foreign Affairs and Trade
raises issues with political parties on international aid and development issues
works to increase public awareness of international development needs and issues

It facilitates the Non-Governmental Organisations Disaster Relief Forum, an open forum for New Zealand-based NGOs that have an interest and involvement in international humanitarian response and emergency management issues. This is an autonomous sub-committee.

External links
 Council for International Development

Development charities based in New Zealand